The International Association of Genocide Scholars (IAGS) is an international non-partisan organization that seeks to further research and teaching about the nature, causes, and consequences of genocide, including the Armenian genocide, the Holocaust, the genocides in Cambodia, Rwanda, Burundi, Bosnia-Herzogovina, Bangladesh, Sudan, and other nations.  The IAGS also advances policy studies on the prevention of genocide. The association's members consider comparative research, case studies, links between genocide and other human rights violations, predictive models for prevention of genocide, and tribunals and courts for the punishment of genocide. The organization's membership includes academics, anti-genocide activists, artists, genocide survivors, journalists, jurists, and public policy makers. Membership is open to interested persons worldwide.

The association has passed formal resolutions recognizing the Armenian genocide, the Greek and Assyrian genocides, and genocides in Darfur, Zimbabwe, Iran, by ISIS in Syria and Iraq, and in Myanmar against the Rohingya.

The official peer-reviewed academic journal of the association is called Genocide Studies and Prevention.

History 

The origins of the IAGS go back to the early 1980s. At this time, a small group of scholars and teachers were using a comparative framework to study genocide. Leo Kuper published his seminal book Genocide in 1980 and Helen Fein published Accounting for Genocide in 1979.

Israel Charny organized the first conference on the comparative analysis of genocide in Jerusalem in 1982.  The Institute for the Study of Genocide was founded in New York in 1982 by Helen Fein. Gregory Stanton founded The Cambodian Genocide Project in 1982 to bring Khmer Rouge leaders to justice. It became part of Genocide Watch in 1999.

These early genocide scholars, a number of whom began with study of the Holocaust, were attacked by other scholars who insisted on the "uniqueness" of the Holocaust.

The pioneers in genocide studies also confronted institutional pressures. For example, it was a challenge to get platforms in traditional conferences such as the American Historical Association, the International Studies Association, the American Sociological Association, etc.

Traditional academic disciplines did not find room for the interdisciplinary nature of genocide studies, so universities seldom had faculty positions for genocide scholars.

However, what had been a marginalized area of study became one of urgent interest and scholarship as a response to the genocides in Rwanda and the Balkans in 1994 and 1995.

The Association of Genocide Scholars 
The idea for an organization of genocide scholars grew out of a meeting between Israel Charny, Helen Fein, Robert Melson and Roger Smith at the Remembering for the Future Two conference, held at Humboldt University in Berlin in 1994. With over 500 persons in attendance and numerous panels and presentations, there was only one three-hour session on the comparative study of genocide. Hence, there was discussion of the need to create an organization that focused on the study and prevention of genocide.

The Association of Genocide Scholars (AGS) was established in 1994.  During this initial period, the AGS shared a website and affiliation with the Institute for the Study of Genocide.

The organization's first conference was held in 1995 at the College of William and Mary in Williamsburg, Virginia, US, with about 45 persons attending. Helen Fein served as the association's first President.

Subsequent biennial conferences were held at Concordia University (Montreal) in 1997, the University of Wisconsin, Madison in 1999, and the University of Minnesota in 2001.

With the rapid growth and global interest in genocide studies, a number of scholars pushed for a more international perspective and argued that conferences should be held outside North America. The organization revised its by-laws in 2001 and was renamed the International Association of Genocide Scholars. The revised bylaws provided that at least one officer be from outside North America, and that biennial conferences regularly be held outside North America.

The International Association of Genocide Scholars 

The IAGS conference at the University of Galway, Ireland in 2003 was the first held outside North America. There were over 200 participants, with a significant increase in participation by European scholars. The increase also reflected growing scholarship in comparative genocide studies.

In 2005, Florida Atlantic University, Boca Raton, Florida, hosted the IAGS conference. Israel Charny was elected president.

In 2006, the IAGS, in partnership with the Zoryan Institute, an Armenian organization in Toronto, Canada, began publication of Genocide Studies and Prevention.  It became an on-line publication, free to all, in 2012. At that time, the Zoryan Institute withdrew its co-sponsorship of the IAGS Journal in favor of publishing its own journal.

In 2007, Gregory Stanton became President of the International Association of Genocide Scholars.  Stanton incorporated the IAGS and obtained its non-profit status. The IAGS launched the organization's listserv and website and revised its bylaws. Its financial practices were reformed.

The 2007 IAGS biennial conference was held in Sarajevo, Bosnia.  It was the first IAGS conference to be held in a country that had recently experienced genocide, with major participation from genocide survivors in their own language.  Over 500 people attended the conference, including many participants from Bosnia, Africa, Asia, and the Middle East.

The 2009 IAGS conference was held at George Mason University, Virginia, US.  

The association held its first conference in South America in 2011 in Buenos Aires, Argentina.  It included over 300 participants, a significant number of whom were from Argentina and other Latin American countries.

The 2013 IAGS conference was held in Siena, Italy.

In 2014 the IAGS held a mid-term conference at the University of Winnipeg, Manitoba, Canada.  It was the first conference to focus on the genocide of Native Americans.  It included sessions with these First Peoples on their own land.

The 2015 IAGS Biennial Meeting held in Yerevan, Armenia, focused on the Armenian genocide.

The 2017 conference in Brisbane, Australia, focused on the genocide of the Aboriginal peoples of Australia.

The 2019 IAGS conference was held in Cambodia.  It focused on the Cambodian genocide and other Asian genocides and included significant participation from Cambodians.  It was the first IAGS conference held in Asia.

The 2021 IAGS conference was held virtually due to the COVID-19 pandemic. It was hosted by the University of  Barcelona, Catalonia, Spain.  It focused on the risks of conflicts and genocide that may be related to environmental destruction, climate change, and the world's population explosion. 

The 2023 IAGS conference was scheduled to be held in person and virtually at the University of Barcelona, Catalonia, Spain.

Presidents
The following persons are or have been president of the association::
Melanie O'Brien (2021 - present)
Henry Theriault (2017–2021)
Andrew Woolford (2015–2017)
Daniel Feierstein (2013–2015)
Alexander Hinton (2011–2013)
William Schabas (2009–2011)
Gregory H. Stanton (2007–2009)
Israel W. Charny (2005–2007)
Robert Melson (2003–2005)
Joyce Apsel (2001–2003)
Frank Chalk (1999–2001)
Roger Smith (1997–1999)
Helen Fein (1995–1997)

Notable people 
 

Janja Beč, Serbian-born sociologist, genocide researcher, writer and lecturer

See also
 Outline of Genocide studies

References

External links 

 
Yale University Genocide Studies on Ponce de Leon

International criminal law
International learned societies
Organizations established in 1994
Genocide research and prevention organisations